Patsville is an extinct town in Elko County, in the U.S. state of Nevada. The GNIS classifies it as a populated place. Located approximately two miles south of Mountain City on NSR 225, the community is part of the Elko Micropolitan Statistical Area.

The former mining community existed from about 1932 until 1949.

See also

Government Peak Wilderness

Notes

Ghost towns in Elko County, Nevada
Unincorporated communities in Nevada
Populated places established in 1932
Elko, Nevada micropolitan area
Ghost towns in Nevada
Unincorporated communities in Elko County, Nevada